Dennis Selby (15 October 1920 – 5 August 1969) was a Welsh footballer, who played as a winger in the Football League for Chester.

References

Chester City F.C. players
Association football wingers
Altrincham F.C. players
English Football League players
1920 births
1969 deaths
Welsh footballers
People from Broughton, Flintshire
Sportspeople from Flintshire